Teri Lynn Reeves (née Kretz) is an American theater and television actress. Her television credits include Chicago Fire, Battleground, and NCIS.

Early life
Reeves was born in Northern California but moved many times in her life. She lived in Houston, TX, Grand Rapids, MI, Santa Barbara, and San Diego, and now resides in LA.

Career
Reeves' desire to become an actress began as a young girl while she was watching Katharine Hepburn in The Philadelphia Story. She began attending UC Santa Barbara as a math major, but decided to audition for the acting program and was accepted. Reeves studied in the BFA program at UC Santa Barbara and the MFA program at UC San Diego.

Reeves' most notable roles are KJ Jameson on Battleground, Hallie Thomas on Chicago Fire and Dorothy Gale on Once Upon a Time.

Personal life
Reeves holds a black belt in Brazilian Jiu Jitsu under Professor Romulo Barral, which she practices almost daily. Reeves has a cavalier king charles spaniel named Willow.

In 2005, she married Jonathan Reeves. The couple divorced in 2014.

Filmography
Films

Television Shows

References

External links

Official Website

American film actresses
American television actresses
American practitioners of Brazilian jiu-jitsu
People awarded a black belt in Brazilian jiu-jitsu
Female Brazilian jiu-jitsu practitioners
University of California, Santa Barbara alumni
University of California, San Diego alumni
Actresses from the San Francisco Bay Area
Living people
21st-century American actresses
1981 births